Amer Ordagić (born 5 May 1993) is a Bosnian professional footballer who plays as a defensive midfielder for Sandefjord in the Norwegian Eliteserien.

International career
On 9 January 2018, Ordagić was named in the Bosnia and Herzegovina preliminary squad for two friendly fixtures versus the United States and Mexico, but did not make the final team.

Career statistics

Club

References

External links
Amer Ordagić at Sofascore

1993 births
Living people
Sportspeople from Tuzla
Bosnia and Herzegovina footballers
OFK Gradina players
NK Zvijezda Gradačac players
FK Sloboda Tuzla players
SK Brann players
Premier League of Bosnia and Herzegovina players
Eliteserien players
Association football midfielders